Josef Smolka (22 March 1939, Troubky – 1 June 2020) was a Czech volleyball player who competed for Czechoslovakia in the 1968 Summer Olympics. In 1968 he was part of the Czechoslovak team which won the bronze medal in the Olympic tournament. He played seven matches.

References

External links
 profile

1939 births
2020 deaths
People from Přerov District
Czech men's volleyball players
Czechoslovak men's volleyball players
Olympic volleyball players of Czechoslovakia
Volleyball players at the 1968 Summer Olympics
Olympic bronze medalists for Czechoslovakia
Olympic medalists in volleyball
Medalists at the 1968 Summer Olympics
Sportspeople from the Olomouc Region